The Sydney Metros were one of the eight foundation teams of the now defunct Australian Baseball League. They disbanded after the 1989–90 season due to heavy financial losses and sold their licence to the Sydney Wave.

The Metros played out of the Sydney Football Stadium, Moore Park, but won no games at the venue, finishing their first and only season with a win% of just .077, just over 30 games behind the Waverley Reds.

History

See also 
Sport in Australia
Australian Baseball
Australian Baseball League (1989-1999)

External links
The Australian Baseball League: 1989-1999

Australian Baseball League (1989–1999) teams
Defunct baseball teams in Australia